Dorrell is a surname. Notable people with the surname include:

Arthur Dorrell (1896–1942), English international footballer
George Thomas Dorrell VC, MBE (1880–1971), English recipient of the Victoria Cross
Jimmy Dorrell, executive director of Mission Waco in Waco, TX and pastor of Church Under the Bridge
Karl Dorrell (born 1963), American football coach and former player
Philip Dorrell (1914–1994), English cricketer
Scholanda Dorrell (born 1983), American professional women's basketball player
Stephen Dorrell (born 1952), British politician

de:Dorrell